Wakachichibu Komei (real name Komei Kato, 16 March 1939 – 17 September 2014) was a sumo wrestler from Chichibu, Saitama, Japan. He made his professional debut in May 1954 and reached the top division in September 1958. His highest rank was sekiwake. Upon retirement from active competition he became an elder in the Japan Sumo Association, under the name Tokiwayama. He reached the Sumo Association's mandatory retirement age in March 2004.

Career record
The Kyushu tournament was first held in 1957, and the Nagoya tournament in 1958.

See also
Glossary of sumo terms
List of past sumo wrestlers
List of sumo tournament top division runners-up
List of sumo tournament second division champions
List of sekiwake

References

1939 births
2014 deaths
Japanese sumo wrestlers
Sumo people from Saitama Prefecture
Sekiwake